Loch Leven may refer to:
Bodies of water in Scotland
 Loch Leven (Kinross), a freshwater loch in Perth and Kinross
 Loch Leven Castle, a fortress on the loch
 William Douglas of Lochleven, later the 6th Earl of Morton 
 Loch Leven (Highlands), a sea loch on the west coast of Scotland, south of Fort William
Lakes and places elsewhere
 Loch Leven, Newfoundland and Labrador, a lake and inhabited place in Newfoundland and Labrador, Canada
 Loch Leven, Saskatchewan, a hamlet in Saskatchewan, Canada
 Loch Leven (California), a lake in California, U.S.
Other
 "Loch Leven", a song by Arab Strap from Monday at the Hug and Pint